The women's 200 metre freestyle event at the 2004 Olympic Games was contested at the Olympic Aquatic Centre of the Athens Olympic Sports Complex in Athens, Greece on August 16 and 17.

Camelia Potec became the second Romanian swimmer to claim a gold medal in swimming (the first being done by Diana Mocanu in Sydney), outside the record time of 1:58.03. The silver medal was awarded to 15-year-old Federica Pellegrini of Italy, who finished behind Potec by 0.19 of a second, clocking at 1:58.22. France's Solenne Figuès, on the other hand, took home the bronze in 1:58.45. World record holder Franziska van Almsick, however, finished outside of medals in fifth place, with a time of 1:58.88.

Records
Prior to this competition, the existing world and Olympic records were as follows.

Results

Heats

Semifinals

Semifinal 1

Semifinal 2

Final

References

External links
Official Olympic Report

W
2004 in women's swimming
Women's events at the 2004 Summer Olympics